Mikulov (Nikolshburg) is a town in Břeclav District in the South Moravian Region of the Czech Republic. It has about 7,400 inhabitants. The historic centre of Mikulov is well preserved and is protected by law as an urban monument reservation.

Administrative parts
Mikulov is made up of one administrative part.

Geography
It borders the Austrian municipality of Drasenhofen. 

Mikulov lies mostly in the Mikulov Highlands, but the municipal territory also extends into the Lower Morava Valley on the east and into the Dyje–Svratka Valley on the west. Most of the territory lies within the Pálava Protected Landscape Area.

Other notable body of water is Janičův vrch, a flooded former sandstone quarry, protected as a nature monument, and occasionally used for swimming.

History

The first written mention of Mikulov is from 1173. In a 1249 deed, issued by the Přemyslid margrave Ottokar II who granted it, including a castle and the surrounding area, to the Austrian noble Henry I of Liechtenstein. After King Rudolf I of Germany had defeated Ottokar at the 1278 Battle on the Marchfeld, he then vested Henry II of Liechtenstein with market rights in villa Nicolspurch. German citizens were called to settle in Mikulov.

In 1526, the Anabaptist leader Balthasar Hubmaier came from Switzerland to Nikolsburg, where he was captured and arrested by the forces of the King Ferdinand I in the following year. The town remained in the Liechtenstein family until 1560, and in 1572 Emperor Maximilian II granted the fief to his ambassador to the Spanish court Adam von Dietrichstein. From 1575 until the 20th century, Nikolsburg remained the proprietary possession of the Dietrichstein noble family and its Mensdorff-Pouilly successors.

After 1575, the renaissance reconstruction of the town began. During the rule of Cardinal Franz von Dietrichstein, the town was transformed into a representative economic, building and cultural residence and for a time became one of the most important towns in Moravia. In 1621, during the Thirty Years' War, Franz von Dietrichstein signed the Treaty of Nikolsburg with the Transylvanian prince Gabriel Bethlen at Mikulov Castle. Four years later, Emperor Ferdinand II and his aulic council met at the castle, where General Albrecht von Wallenstein received his commission and was elevated to a Duke of Friedland. Franz von Dietrichstein also established the first Piarist college north of the Alps in Nikolsburg.

After a fire damaged the original Mikulov Castle in 1719, the Dietrichstein family reconstructed the château to its present appearance. After the Austro-Prussian War, Count Alajos Károlyi began work on a peace treaty in Nikolsburg that led to the Treaty of Prague in 1866.

The German population formed majority until 1945. In 1890, it formed 98% of the population and in 1930 formed 82% of the population. Following the World War II, the town's German population was expelled by the Czechoslovak government according to the Beneš decrees.

Jewish population

The beginning of the Jewish settlement in Nikolsburg dates as far as 1421, when Jews were expelled from Vienna and the neighboring province of Lower Austria by the duke of Austria, Albert II of Germany.

The settlement grew in importance and in the first half of the 16th century Nikolsburg became the seat of the regional rabbi of Moravia, thus becoming a cultural centre of Moravian Jewry. The famous rabbi Judah Loew ben Bezalel (1525–1609), who is said to have created the golem of Prague, officiated here for twenty years as the second regional rabbi between 1553 and 1573. Cardinal Franz von Dietrichstein, son of Adam von Dietrichstein, was a special protector of the Jews, whose taxes were necessary to finance the Thirty Years' War.

In the first half of the 18th century, the congregation in Nikolsburg totalled over 600 families, being the largest Jewish settlement in Moravia. The census of 1754 decreed by Empress Maria Theresa of Austria ascertained that there were some 620 families established in Nikolsburg, i.e. the Jewish population of about 3,000 comprised half of the town's inhabitants. Only a small number of Jews could make their living in the town as artisans; the rest had to become merchants. The congregation suffered severely during the Silesian Wars between 1740 and 1763, when they had to furnish the monarchy with their share in the supertaxes exacted by the government of Maria Theresa from the Jews of Moravia.

Quite a number of Nikolsburg Jews continued to earn their livelihood in Vienna, where they were permitted to stay for some time on special passports. The freedom of residence, which was conceded to the Jews in Austria in 1848, reduced the number of resident Jews in Nikolsburg to less than one-third of the population which it contained at the time of its highest development. In 1904, there were 749 Jewish residents in the town, out of a total population of 8,192. In 1938, prior to the German occupation of Czechoslovakia, the town population totaled about 8,000 mostly German-speaking inhabitants. Out of these, 472 were Jewish at this time. The Jewish settlement in Nikolsburg ceased to exist during World War II, as only 110 managed to emigrate in time, and 327 of Mikulov's Jews did not survive the Holocaust. On 15 April 1945, 21 Hungarian Jewish prisoners working in a clay pit were massacred.

Demographics

Economy
Mikulov is a centre of Czech wine-making due to its favorable geographic location and climate, as well as its unique history. Mikulov is not only the centre, but the namesake of, the Moravian wine sub-region Mikulov wine region. Twelve registered cadastral vineyard tracts are situated within the Mikulov wine village as defined under the Czech Viticulture Act. Other significant economic activities in Mikulov are the machine-making and clay industries, as well as oil found at the edge of the Vienna Basin.

Transport
In the south, there is the road border crossing Mikulov / Drasenhofen. The highway is part of the European route E461 and is to be extended as the D52 motorway.

Mikulov lies on the railway line from Břeclav to Znojmo.

Sights

The main sight is the Mikulov Castle. The castle was built in the place of a Romanesque castle. At the turn of the 16th and 17th centuries, it was rebuilt in the Renaissance style, and in the late 17th century in the Baroque style. The last major reconstruction was made after the fire in 1719. Today it is the seat of Regional Museum in Mikulov.

The historic town square was founded in the late 16th century near the castle. It contains Renaissance houses from the first half of the 17th century. One of the most significant houses is the U Rytířů House decorated with sgraffito. In the middle of the square is a fountain from around 1700 and monumental Baroque Holy Trinity Column from 1723–1724.

In Mikulov there are several historic churches. The originally Romanesque Church of St. Wenceslaus was built in the early 15th century and includes an ossuary. The Baroque Church of St. John the Baptist was consecrated in 1679 and belonged to the Piarist college. The interior has valuable decoration by painter Franz Anton Maulbertsch. The neo-Gothic Orthodox Church of St. Nicolas was built in 1903. On the Svatý Kopeček Hill, there is the Chapel of St. Sebastian. The way to the chapel is lined by Stations of the Cross.

The history of the Jewish community is presented by an educational trail through the old Jewish quarter. The synagogue, originally built in the 16th century and baroque rebuilt after the fire in 1719, is the only preserved synagogue in Moravia of the so-called Polish type. It houses an exposition on Rabbi Loew and Jewish education in Moravia. The large Jewish cemetery is one of the most significant in the country. It was founded in the mid-15th century, contains around 4,000 tombs, and the oldest preserved readable tomb is from 1605.

Other important sight is the Dietrichstein tomb. It was built as a copy of the Holy House of Loreto in 1623–1656.

Notable people

Born in Mikulov

Johann Ferdinand Hertodt (1645–1722), German physician and writer
Moses ben Avraham Avinu (?–1733/34), Moravian-Austrian printer and author
Jakab Fellner (1722–1780), German-Moravian Baroque architect
Joseph Antony Adolph (1729–c. 1771), painter
Joseph von Sonnenfels (1732–1817), Austrian-German jurist and novelist
Anton Joseph Leeb (1769–1837), Mayor of Vienna (1835–1837)
Romeo Seligmann (1808–1892), Austrian physician and medical historian
Heinrich Landesmann (1821–1902), Austrian poet and philosophical writer
Heinrich Auspitz (1835–1886), Austrian dermatologist
Leopold Oser (1839–1910), Austrian physician
Elkan Bauer (1852–1942), Austrian composer
Max Pohl (1855–1935), Austrian actor
Erich Fritz Schweinburg (1890–1959), Austrian writer and attorney
Adolf Schärf (1890–1965), Austrian politician and President of Austria (1957–1965)
Manfred Ackermann (1898–1991), Austrian politician
Karel Krautgartner (1922–1982), musician

Resided in Mikulov

Balthasar Hubmaier (c. 1480–1528), German Anabaptist leader
Leonhard Schiemer (c. 1500–1528), Austrian Anabaptist writer
Maximilian, Prince of Dietrichstein (1596–1655), owner of the Mikulov estate
Aaron Samuel Kaidanover (1614–1676), Polish-Lithuanian rabbi
Joseph Almosnino (1642–1689), Greek-Serbian rabbi
Judah he-Hasid (1660–1700), Jewish preacher
Yaakov Yitzchak of Lublin (1745–1815), Polish rabbi
Abraham Trebitsch (1760–1840), Austrian Jewish scholar
Simcha Bunim of Peshischa (1765–1827), Polish rabbi
Abraham Neuda (1812–1854), Moravian rabbi
Joel Deutsch (1813–1899), Jewish writer and deaf educator
Simon Bacher (1823–1891), Hungarian Neo-Hebraic poet
Meyer Kayserling (1829–1905), German rabbi
Samuel Baeck (1834–1912), German rabbi
Karl Renner (1870–1950), Austrian politician, President of Austria (1945–1950)

Rabbis

Judah Loew ben Bezalel (c. 1553–1573)
Judah Löb Eilenburg (1574–1618)
Gabriel ben Chajjim ben Sinaj (1618–1624)
Yom-Ṭob Lipmann Heller (1624– )
Pethahiah ben Joseph (1631–1637)
Abraham ben Mordechaj Jaffe (1637–1647)
Menahem Mendel Krochmal (1648–1661)
Gershon Ashkenazi (1661– )
Aaron Jacob ben Ezekiel ( –1671)
Judah Löb (1672–1684)
Eliezer Mendel Fanta (1684–1690)
David Oppenheim (1690–1702)
Gabriel Eskeles (1709–1718)
Bernard Eskeles (1718–1753)
Moses Lwow-Lemburger (1753–1757)
Gershon Politz (1757–1772)
Shmuel Shmelke (1772–1778)
Gershon Chajes (1780–1789)
Mordecai Benet (1789–1829)
Nahum Trebitsch (1831–1842)
Samson Raphael Hirsch (1847–1851)
Hirsch Teltscher (1851–1853)
Isak Weinberger (1853–1855)
Solomon Quetsch (1855–1856)
Mayer Feuchtwang (1861–1888)
David Feuchtwang (1892–1903)
Moritz Levin (since 1903–1918)
Alfred Willmann (1919–1938)

Twin towns – sister cities

Mikulov is twinned with:
 Bardejov, Slovakia 
 Galanta, Slovakia  
Katzrin, Golan Heights

 Šumperk, Czech Republic
 Tuchów, Poland

Gallery

Panorama

See also
Old Hungarian alphabet of Nikolsburg
Ostlandkreuz

References

External links

Mikulov Regional Museum
Wine of the Czech Republic
Presentation of Mikulov with a photo gallery
Nikolsburg (Jewish Encyclopedia)
Jewish Nikolsburg Organization

 
Populated places in Břeclav District
Cities and towns in the Czech Republic
Historic Jewish communities
Shtetls
Austria–Czech Republic border crossings
Holocaust locations in Czechoslovakia